Enrico Gatti (born 1955) is an Italian violinist, known for playing Baroque music.

Gatti was born in Perugia, Italy.  He graduated from the Geneva Conservatory as a student of Chiara Banchini and the Royal Conservatory of The Hague with Sigiswald Kuijken. He has been a professor of Baroque violin at several conservatories. He has played with numerous ensembles and founded the Ensemble Aurora, a quartet which plays Baroque music in the traditional style, in 1986.

Footnotes

References
 Live in Studio 4A - Enrico Gatti and the Ensemble Aurora. NPR. Accessed 2011-01-30.

Italian classical violinists
Male classical violinists
People from Perugia
1955 births
Living people
Baroque-violin players
Italian performers of early music
21st-century classical violinists
21st-century Italian male musicians